The Battle of Takur Ghar was a short but intense military engagement between United States special operations forces and al-Qaeda insurgents fought in March 2002, atop Takur Ghar mountain in Afghanistan. For the U.S. side, the battle proved the deadliest entanglement of Operation Anaconda, an effort early in the War in Afghanistan to rout al-Qaeda forces from the Shahi-Kot Valley and Arma Mountains. The battle saw three helicopter landings by the U.S. on the mountain top, each met with direct assault from al-Qaeda forces. Although Takur Ghar was eventually taken, seven U.S. service members were killed and 12 others were wounded. The battle is also known as the Battle of Roberts Ridge, after the first casualty of the battle, Navy SEAL Neil C. Roberts.

Prelude
In the evening of 3 March 2002, the Task Force 11 leadership essentially ordered the Delta Force AFO commander to pass control of the AFO teams involved in the Operation Anaconda to the SEALs of Task Force Blue-who were moving teams in from Bagram to Gardez for this purpose. The SEALs were not heavily involved in the Operation up to this point but the TF11 commander bluntly ordered their deployment as well as changing the immediate command in an ongoing operation, possibly so that the SEALs could gain combat experience.

Battle
In the late evening of March 3, two SEAL teams from DEVGRU, MAKO 30 & MAKO 21, led by Lieutenant Commander Vic Hyder (MAKO 21) and Senior Chief Petty Officer Britt K. Slabinski (MAKO 30), were to arrive in Gardez for immediate insertion into the Shahi-Kot Valley. MAKO 21 planned to link up with AFO team Juliet at the northern end of the valley, resupply it and then establish a hide site/observation post on the eastern ridge above Task Force Rakkasan's blocking position; whilst MAKO 30 planned to establish an observation point on the peak of Takur Ghar, which commanded a view of the Shahi-Kot valley. Due to time constraints, a helicopter insertion would be needed for the team to reach the peak before dawn. Further complications arose during the second lift off as they were delayed due to an air assault in proximity of the LZ. With the threat of daylight getting near, the SEALs chose the peak itself as the insertion point.

The two teams were picked up by two MH-47 Chinook helicopters of the 160th Special Operations Aviation Regiment, Razor 03 and Razor 04, at 11:23 PM on March 3. However, Razor 03 experienced engine difficulties, and two new MH-47s were dispatched to replace the original helicopters. This delay meant that the SEALs could not be inserted into the landing zone east of the peak until 2:30 AM on March 4, with not enough time to reach the peak before daylight.

An AC-130H Spectre, Nail 22, flew a reconnaissance mission over the peak prior to the landing and saw no enemy activity, but it was called away to support other troops before Razor 03 and 04 arrived at the landing zone; MAKO 30 team leader was uneasy at the speed with which the sweep was conducted and wondered whether they had the right mountain but he dismissed his doubts and trusted the Spectre's technology. At around 0245 hours, as Razor 03 flared to land at the LZ and was immediately fired upon by machinegun and RPGs, an RPG struck just behind the cockpit, starting a fire in the cabin. As machinegun rounds penetrated the unarmored Chinook, another RPG, seconds after the first, hit the Chinook's right-side radar pod, which blew out all electrical power to the helicopter, particularly its miniguns and navigational systems. The Chinook was hit by a further 2 RPGs and more heavy automatic weapons fire from at least three distinct firing points (particularly from a supposedly abandoned DShK position). The Chinook set down at a slight depression, shielding the pilots from the DShK's fire.

The pilot, Chief Warrant Officer Alan Mack, made the call to take the stricken helicopter off; as he brought the Chinook back into the air, PO1 Neil C. Roberts fell out of the open ramp. SOAR crew chief Sgt. Dan Madden grabbed hold of his pack but lost his grip. Roberts fell  into the snow covering Takur Ghar and activated his infrared strobe to mark his position. Razor 04, piloted by Chief Warrant Officer Jason Friel, returned to the peak to attempt to rescue Roberts, as the Chinook offloaded MAKO 30, they came under immediate fire from the DShK, though it was relatively unscathed and left the AO after MAKO 30 successfully disembarked.

At first, the insurgents didn't spot MAKO 30 in the early morning darkness, MAKO 30 split up into two-man pairs to conduct bounding movements, making good ground until the enemy spotted them. One team ran across a concealed al-Qaeda bunker and killed 3 fighters before the SEALs were suppressed by other fighters with a PKM machine gun. The firefight lasted 20 minutes before the team leader decided to order his team to break contact, USAF combat controller Master Sergeant John A. Chapman (then Technical Sergeant) and two SEALs were wounded. Mako 30 was forced off the peak due to its losses and requested the assistance of the quick-reaction force mainly made up of Rangers from the 1st Battalion Ranger located at Bagram Air Base, led by Captain Nate Self. Master Sergeant Chapman was mistakenly believed to have been killed prior to Mako 30 withdrawing from the peak. Alone and wounded twice in the torso, facing superior numbers of enemy insurgents, drone footage showed Sergeant Chapman killing at least two of the insurgents, one who was charging at him, one in hand-to-hand combat, before being killed by small arms fire.

The quick reaction force (QRF) consisted of 19 Rangers, Tactical Air Control Party (TACP) Staff Sergeant Kevin Vance, and a three-man USAF special tactics team (PJs and Combat Controllers) carried by two Chinooks, Razor 01 and Razor 02. As Air Force rules prohibited AC-130 aircraft from remaining in hostile airspace in daylight after the crash of an AC-130 during the Battle of Khafji in the Gulf War, the AC-130 support (callsign GRIM-32), whose protecting Mako 30 was forced to leave before Razor 01 reached the LZ. During the flight, the Ranger commander was informed that his team was to land and extract a "SEAL sniper team" that was in contact with the enemy, which was false. Further communications difficulties meant that the pilot of the AC-130, GRIM-32, was unaware that Razor 01 was incoming. At approximately 0610 hours, Razor 01, under the command of Captain Nate Self, reached the landing zone. The aircraft immediately began taking fire from RPG, DShK and small arms fire, and the right door minigunner, Sergeant Philip Svitak, was killed and the helicopter pilots, Chief Warrant Officers Greg Calvert and Chuck Gant, were seriously wounded by the small arms fire. An RPG then hit the helicopter, destroying the right engine and forcing it to crash land. As the Rangers and special tactics team exited the aircraft, Private First Class Matt Commons (posthumously promoted to Corporal), Sergeant Brad Crose, and Specialist Marc Anderson were killed (Anderson was shot and killed inside the helicopter while Commons and Crose were gunned down on the helicopter ramp). The surviving crew and quick-reaction force took cover behind a hillock and a fierce firefight began. CPT Self decided to suppress the enemy firing points and launch a counterattack against the peak, bounding forward in subteams (one team firing while the other moved forward). They advanced about 20m before the weight of enemy fire forced them into cover.

Razor 02, which had been diverted to Gardez as Razor 01 was landing on Takur Ghar, returned with the rest of the quick-reaction force at 0625 hours. The Rangers' movement up the hill was a physically demanding 2-hour effort under heavy mortar fire and in thin mountain air. They climbed the 45-70 degree slope, most of it covered in a meter (3 ft) of snow, weighted down by their weapons, body armor and equipment. By 1030 am local time, the men covered half of the 50m distance to the enemy positions when they were engaged by PKM fire. They were exhausted and the enemy at the top of the hill a mere  from their position. Meanwhile, the Rangers on the peak called in several Danger Close gun runs from orbiting F-15E and F-16C aircraft to suppress the enemy before again attempting another ground assault. However, the Ranger commander realized that what they had assumed was fallen logs and foliage was actually a fortified bunker. He ordered his Rangers to withdraw as they did not have enough men to start clearing them and other prepared positions. The attached USAF CCT, Lawrence Cain vectored in airstrikes to keep the al-Qaeda forces at bay until the rest of the Rangers arrived; the CCT directed a number of strikes on the peak, which were well within the normal safety limits and he also called in a strike from a MQ-1 Predator UAV (which was the first recorded use of the vehicle), one of the two Hellfire missiles it fired collapsed the bunker. As the ten men of Razor 02 arrived, the Rangers prepared to assault the enemy positions. As the Air Force CCT Lawrence Cain called in a last airstrike on the enemy bunkers and with two machine guns providing suppression fire, 14 Rangers stormed the hill as quickly as they could in the knee-deep snow – shooting and throwing grenades. Within minutes, the Rangers took the hill, killing several al Qaeda fighters.

The force was able to consolidate its position on the peak. An enemy counterattack midday mortally wounded Senior Airman Jason D. Cunningham, a pararescueman who died six hours after being hit. The wounded were refused medical evacuation during the daylight hours, due to risk of another downed helicopter. However, Australian SASR soldiers, along with U.S. Air Force Combat Controller Jim Hotaling, had infiltrated nearby prior to the first helicopter crash as part of a long range reconnaissance mission. They remained undetected in an observation post through the firefight and CCT Jim Hotaling proved critical in co-ordinating multiple Coalition air strikes to prevent the al Qaeda fighters from overrunning the downed aircraft. This, plus the actions of the two SASR operators working with the 10th Mountain, earned the commander of the Australian SASR force in Afghanistan the U.S. Bronze Star for his unit's outstanding contribution to the war on terrorism.

At 20:15 hours, the quick-reaction force and Mako 30/21 were exfiltrated from the Takur Ghar peak.

For their actions on Takur Ghar, Chapman, Cunningham, and Technical Sergeant Keary J. Miller were awarded the Air Force Cross, the second highest award for bravery. Chapman and Slabinski were, in 2018, awarded the highest and most prestigious personal military decoration in the US, the Medal of Honor. Electronics Technician Second Class Brett Morganti was awarded the Navy Cross.

Fate of Roberts and Chapman
It is not certain whether Roberts died immediately or was killed by opposing fighters later. There is a possibility that the sailor was captured by the al Qaeda fighters after being shot in the right leg, and executed later with a single shot to the back of the head. (One of the feeds showed a group of 8–10 fighters huddling around what appeared to be a body; both GRIM-32 and MAKO 30 noted that an IR strobe was active, a video feed showed the fighters passing the IR strobe around.) This report has not been confirmed. MG Frank Hagenbeck did confirm that al Qaeda fighters were seen (on live video feed from a Predator drone orbiting the firefight) chasing Roberts, and later dragging his body away from the spot where he fell. Another feed from the same Predator showed a puff of heat [from a rifle] and the indistinct figure in front of it fall. Also, the quick-reaction soldiers reported fighters wearing Roberts' gear and finding "a helmet with a bullet hole in it, [from which] it was clear the last person [Roberts] to wear it had been shot in the head". Other reports have Roberts surviving for nearly an hour and inflicting serious casualties on opposing forces with his pistol and grenades before his death.

Predator drone footage also shows the possibility that Chapman was alive and fighting on the peak after the SEALs left rather than being killed outright as thought by MAKO 30. A man was seen fighting in a bunker against multiple enemies until hit by an RPG. If this man was Chapman, he succumbed to a single gunshot wound to the heart "just a mere 45 seconds before... Razor 01 appeared over the mountaintop". The White House announced on July 27, 2018, that Chapman would posthumously receive the Medal of Honor at an August 22, 2018 ceremony.

Col. Andrew N. Milani (former commander of the 160th Special Operations Aviation Regiment) and Dr. Stephen D. Biddle noted in their 2003 United States Army War College publication that the Predator was on station 90 minutes after Roberts had fallen; the images that were shot before the Predator had arrived were shot by GRIM-32's Infrared Cameras, although this has not been confirmed by commanders.

Presented with the Air Force analysis in 2016, Colonel Milani submitted an addendum to his paper. "With some of the original uncertainty removed, I can state that the probability now lies more in favor of Chapman surviving the original assault", he wrote.

U.S. casualties

Killed 
SEAL Team Six:
 Petty Officer First Class Neil "Fifi" C. Roberts

United States Air Force Combat Control Team:
 Master Sergeant John A. Chapman

United States Air Force Pararescue:
 Senior Airman Jason D. Cunningham

75th Ranger Regiment:
 Corporal Matthew A. Commons
 Sergeant Bradley S. Crose
 Specialist Marc A. Anderson

160th Special Operations Aviation Regiment (Airborne):
 Sergeant Philip "Spytech" Svitak

Wounded 
SEAL Team Six:
 Aviation Boatswain's Mate 1st Class Stephen “Turbo” Toboz Jr., wounded in the left lower leg.
 Electronics Technician 2nd Class Brett Morganti, wounded in both legs.

160th Special Operations Aviation Regiment (Airborne):
 Chief Warrant Officer Donald Tabron, wounded by a single gunshot wound in the index finger.
 Sergeant First Class Cory Lamoreaux, wounded by a single gunshot wound in the abdomen.
 Staff Sergeant David Dube, wounded by a single gunshot wound in the left leg.
 Chief Warrant Officer Greg Calvert, wounded by a single gunshot wound in the left leg.
 Chief Warrant Officer Chuck Gant, wounded by a single gunshot wound in the right hand and RPG fragments.

75th Ranger Regiment:
 Captain Nate Self, wounded by RPG fragments.
 Staff Sergeant Ray DePouli, wounded by RPG fragments.
 Private First Class David Gilliam, wounded by RPG fragments.
 Specialist Aaron Totten-Lancaster, wounded by RPG fragments.
 Staff Sergeant Kevin Vance, wounded by RPG fragments.

In popular culture
The story of the 2010 video game Medal of Honor is based on the Battle of Takur Ghar with the character "Rabbit" loosely based on Neil "Fifi" C. Roberts.
The captain in charge of Ranger Quick Reaction Force (QRF) on MH-47 call sign Razor 01, Nate Self, was dubbed a hero and was subsequently interviewed regarding both the battle and development of PTSD as a result of the incidents. He has written a book entitled "Two Wars" which details his experiences.
The battle is depicted in an episode of the Situation Critical series, as well as the History Channel series The Warfighters.

References

Bibliography
MacPherson, M. 2005. Roberts Ridge: A Story of Courage and Sacrifice on Takur Ghar Mountain, Afghanistan, Delacorte, 
Naylor, S. 2005. Not a Good Day to Die: The Untold Story of Operation Anaconda, Berkley Hardcover, .
 Executive Summary of the Battle of Takur Ghar (pdf)
Self, N. 2008. Two Wars: One Hero's Fight on Two Fronts—Abroad and Within, Tyndale House,

External links
Artist's rendition of the battle

Battles of the War in Afghanistan (2001–2021)
Battles of the War in Afghanistan (2001–2021) involving the United States
Battles of the War in Afghanistan (2001–2021) involving Australia
Operations involving American special forces
March 2002 events in Asia